Shabdukh is a rural locality (a selo) and the administrative centre of Tsudni-Shabdukhsky Selsoviet, Gumbetovsky District, Republic of Dagestan, Russia. The population was 143 as of 2010. There are 5 streets.

Geography 
Shabdukh is located 16 km southwest of Mekhelta (the district's administrative centre) by road. Tsundi and Ichichali are the nearest rural localities.

References 

Rural localities in Gumbetovsky District